Tsai Chen-nan (born 26 July 1954) is a Taiwanese actor and singer.

Tsai was invited by the Hsinkang Foundation of Culture and Education to perform in Xingang, Chiayi, by the organization founder Chen Chin-huang, who sought to mitigate the effects that a widespread  had on his hometown. Tsai performed alongside the Cloud Gate Dance Theater led by fellow Xingang native Lin Hwai-min in June 1987. Tsai won the Golden Melody Award for best Taiwanese vocalist, and the Golden Melody Award for Album of the Year in 1997. His Hokkien pop songs have received attention from China, where he has been considered a "green performer," supportive of Taiwan independence.

Tsai appeared in several films directed by Hou Hsiao-hsien at the start of his acting career. Tsai was a hunter and love interest of Lu Yi-ching's character, a widow, in Kuo Chen-ti's The Boar King (2014).

Selected filmography
A City of Sadness (1989)
Dust of Angels (1992)
The Puppetmaster (1993)
A Borrowed Life (1994)
Heartbreak Island (1995)
Good Men, Good Women (1995)
Betelnut Beauty (2001)
The Year of Happiness and Love (2009)
 (2010)
Monga Yao Hui (2011)
 (2012)
The Ghost Tales (2012)
When a Wolf Falls in Love with a Sheep (2012)
What Is Love (2012)
 (2015)
 (2015)
The Missing Piece (2015)
Youth Power (2015)
Shia Wa Se (2016)
 (2017)
 (2017)
Man in Love (2021)
Marry My Dead Body (2023)

References

External links

1954 births
Living people
Taiwanese singer-songwriters
20th-century Taiwanese male singers
21st-century Taiwanese male singers
21st-century Taiwanese male actors
20th-century Taiwanese male actors
Taiwanese male television actors
Taiwanese male film actors
Taiwanese Hokkien pop singers
People from Chiayi County